William Nicolas Baltz (February 5, 1860 – August 22, 1943) was a U.S. representative from Illinois.

Born in Millstadt, St. Clair County, Illinois, the son of German immigrants, Baltz attended the public schools. He engaged in agricultural pursuits, milling and banking. He was a member of the Millstadt Board of Education and was its president from 1892 to 1917. He was a member of the St. Clair County Board of Supervisors from 1897 to 1913, its presiding officer from 1908 to 1911. He was member of the Democratic county central committee from 1905 to 1913.

Baltz was elected as a Democrat to the Sixty-third Congress (March 4, 1913 – March 3, 1915). He was an unsuccessful candidate for re-election in 1914 to the Sixty-fourth Congress. He was mayor of Millstadt six years. He resumed agricultural and industrial pursuits at Millstadt until his death there on August 22, 1943. He was interred in Mount Evergreen Cemetery.

References

1860 births
1943 deaths
County board members in Illinois
Mayors of places in Illinois
School board members in Illinois
People from Millstadt, Illinois
Democratic Party members of the United States House of Representatives from Illinois